Anasis howitti is a species of beetle in the family Carabidae, the only species in the genus Anasis.

References

Lebiinae